Jaan Mölder (born 9 June 1987) is an Estonian former rally driver.

He took part in 21 World Rally Championship events from 2005 to 2008.

WRC results

JWRC results

References

External links

Profile at eWRC-results.com

1987 births
Living people
Sportspeople from Tartu
Estonian rally drivers
World Rally Championship drivers